Dry Run is a tributary of Susquehecka Creek in Snyder County, Pennsylvania, in the United States. The stream has one unnamed tributary. Both Dry Run and its unnamed tributary are impaired by siltation due to agriculture. Dry Run has been known to experience flooding in Freeburg.

Course
Dry Run begins in a deep valley in Washington Township. It flows east-southeast for several tenths of a mile, receiving an unnamed tributary from the left and passing near White Top. The stream then continues flowing east-southeast for several tenths of a mile, leaving its valley and entering the much broader Pleasant Valley. Here, it turns south-southeast and then southeast for a few tenths of a mile before turning east-southeast. After several tenths of a mile, it turns southeast for a few tenths of a mile, entering Freeburg, crossing Pennsylvania Route 35, reentering Washington Township, and reaching its confluence with Susquehecka Creek.

Tributaries
Dry Run has no named tributaries. However, it does have one unnamed tributary.

Hydrology, geography, and geology

The impairment is siltation due to agricultural activity.

Watershed and biology
The stream is entirely within the United States Geological Survey quadrangle of Freeburg.

Flooding has been known to occur along Dry Run in the borough of Freeburg.

Dry Run has been officially proposed for wild trout designation from its headwaters downstream to its mouth.

History
Dry Run was entered into the Geographic Names Information System on August 2, 1979. Its identifier in the Geographic Names Information System is 1173532.

The Pennsylvania Fish and Boat Commission will consider adding Dry Run to its official list of wild trout streams in its meeting on January 20 and January 21, 2016.

See also
List of rivers of Pennsylvania

References

Rivers of Snyder County, Pennsylvania
Tributaries of the Susquehanna River
Rivers of Pennsylvania